Below are the squads for the 2014 AFC Challenge Cup in Maldives, which took place between 19 and 30 May 2014. The players' listed age is their age on the tournament's opening day

Group A

Maldives
Coach:  Drago Mamić

Palestine
Coach:  Jamal Mahmoud

Kyrgyzstan
Coach:  Sergey Dvoryankov

Myanmar
Coach:  Radojko Avramović

Group B

Turkmenistan
Coach:   Rahym Gurbanmämmedow

Philippines
Coach:  Thomas Dooley

Afghanistan
Coach:  Erich Rutemöller

Laos
Coach:  Norio Tsukitate

References

AFC Challenge Cup squads
Squads